Algernon Percy (1779–1833), was a British diplomat.

Percy was the second son of Algernon Percy, 1st Earl of Beverley and Isabella Burrell, daughter of Peter Burrell. He served as Minister Plenipotentiary to the Swiss Cantons from 1825 to 1832, succeeding Charles Richard Vaughan.

Family
Algernon Percy eventually married in a morganatic arrangement Anne-Marie Prestilly-FitzGerald, illegitimate daughter of Lord Charles FitzGerald, 1st Baron Lecale and Anne-Marie Preston-Prestilly. Their surviving children were:

 Mary Preston Prestilly-Percy, born in Switzerland in 1830, married Henry Hume, a Scottish gentleman.
 Henry Preston Prestilly-Percy, born in Southampton, England around 1832, a diplomat in Peru, married Eliza Díaz de la Peña Lady of Huasan in Argentina, legitimate daughter and heir of :es:Miguel Díaz de la Peña earl of Huasan and Josefa Cabero Gomez Marin.

References

1779 births
1833 deaths
Algernon
Younger sons of earls
Ambassadors of the United Kingdom to Switzerland